The Nashville Metropolitan Transit Authority (Nashville MTA), which does business as WeGo Public Transit, is a public transportation agency based in Nashville, Tennessee. Consisting of city buses and paratransit, the system serves Nashville and Davidson County. Most bus routes serve the downtown transit station, Music City Central. This makes the MTA the largest transit agency where most of the bus routes terminate in a Central Business District with no crosstown service. For 2023, the Nashville MTA expected to collect $5.2 million in fare revenue and to spend $99.3 million in operation. To make up most of the difference, MTA expected to collect subsidies from the city, state, and national governments.

MTA partnered with the Metro Arts Commission, which commissioned six artist-designed transit shelters are placed along the new 28th/31st Avenue Bridge.

The MTA was the only transit agency in the country to implement payment with credit card at the fare box.  That proof of payment approach was discontinued in March 2009.

History
The first public transportation in Nashville began in 1860 when the McGavock and Mt. Vernon Horse Railroad Company and the South Nashville Street Railroad Company were joined to create a public transportation system using steam and mules to power rail cars. The first electric streetcar in Nashville came in 1889. Over the years, several different companies offered transit in Nashville. The first buses came in 1926, as a complement to the preceding rail lines. In 1930, Tennessee Electric Power Company took over the transit system and phased out streetcars by February 1941. In 1953, the company was reorganized and changed its name to Nashville Transit Company. The next 20 years saw the decline of public transportation in Nashville and the rise of the automobile. This led to higher fares and service cutbacks for the transit system. In order to keep public transportation in the city viable, Metro-Nashville government purchased the Nashville Transit Company and created the Metropolitan Transit Authority in 1973.

Due to a major flood in May 2010, Nashville MTA suffered losses to their fleet and their maintenance/administration offices. The total losses amounted to 39 buses and 39 paratransit vans, various other support vehicles and severe damage caused to both the maintenance/administration offices and to the Riverfront Music City Star train station. Service was interrupted for four days, with limited service being restored afterwards for the next four weeks. By early June 2010, Nashville MTA had obtained loaner buses and other vehicles from surrounding transit agencies, including Memphis, Cincinnati, Clarksville and others. Regular transit service was restored shortly thereafter.

On July 12, 2018, the MTA announced that it was re-branding itself as WeGo Public Transit to reflect the changing landscape of public transit in the region and to also coincide with various recommendations from the 2016 nMotion plan. Despite the failure of the 2018 transit referendum, plans for the re-brand the agency were already in place prior to the referendum being held, and the decision to re-brand was made independently of the referendum effort and its outcome.

MTA System
The MTA bus system serves all of Nashville and Davidson County.  While no bus service is directly provided to the autonomous Davidson County incorporated community of Forest Hills, some service is provided, though, to Belle Meade, Berry Hill, Goodlettsville and Oak Hill.

Service to the autonomous Davidson County incorporated community of Lakewood began on Monday, April 30, 2012. Route 27 Old Hickory provides weekday service in Old Hickory via Lakewood. Buses travel to and from downtown Nashville and Madison. New park-n-rides are located at the former City Hall in Lakewood and at the MTA Administrative Offices on Myatt Drive in Madison.

AccessRide
MTA offers a paratransit service operating specialized van services for people with disabilities unable to use regular bus routes. AccessRide provides door-to-door paratransit service in Davidson County within  from a regular bus route. This service also provides elderly people with a way to get to doctors appointments and pick up medication. The fare price for this service is $3.40 per ride.

Park & Ride
MTA & RTA also have a Park & Ride program where passengers can park their cars in designated parking lots and ride the bus to their destination.

Ticket Cost
The cost of tickets mainly depends on the riders age and the number of days or rides the ticket permits. An adult ticket allowing 31 days of unlimited rides (31-day pass) will typically cost more than that of a youth. Some riders receive special discounts because of mental or physical disability.

Regional Transit Authority (RTA)
Outside of Davidson County, MTA collaborates with the Regional Transit Authority of Middle Tennessee (RTA) to provide express service to Franklin, Gallatin, Hendersonville, Lavergne, Smyrna, Murfreesboro, Spring Hill, Joelton and Springfield. These services are operated under contract by Gray Line of Tennessee. MTA also provides connecting bus service with the Music City Star at Riverfront Station in downtown Nashville (linked by downtown shuttles), and Donelson and Hermitage stations within Nashville along the system's East Corridor Line.

RTA held two public hearings on April 24, 2012, regarding proposed regional express bus service from Clarksville to Nashville.

The new express bus service (94X Clarksville Express) began on June 1, 2012. Buses depart weekdays from the Clarksville Rossview Road Park-n-Ride at the Music City Central in downtown Nashville at 6:45 a.m. and 7:45 a.m. The Clarksville Transit System (CTS) provides local bus service to and from the RTA park-n-ride serving the route. CTS fares applies for connecting CTS service. On Monday, April 1, 2013, the 94X Clarksville Express began service to Cheatham County with a stop in Pleasant View. A Park & Ride lot is located at 1502 Substation Road in Pleasant View.

Three RTA bus routes (Routes 84X Murfreesboro Express, 86X Smyrna/LaVergne Express and 87X Gallatin Express) began on Monday, October 1, 2012.

New Congestion Mitigation and Air Quality (CMAQ) funding provides resources for a separate express bus route from Murfreesboro to Nashville.  Route 84X Murfreesboro Express begins service at Middle Tennessee State University (MTSU), continue to a new Park & Ride at the North Boulevard Church of Christ on North Rutherford Boulevard, and then continue on Rutherford and Northfield to NW Broad Street where it travels to Nashville via I-840W and ultimately I-24W. 
 
In addition to the express buses from Murfreesboro, RTA CMAQ funding also provides for a separate express bus route from Smyrna and LaVergne. Buses for Route 86X Smyrna/LaVergne Express begin service at the Smyrna Kmart Park & Ride, continue to LaVergne and to I-24 via Waldron Road.

New Route 87X Gallatin Express provides additional service to Gallatin, including a portion previously served by Route 92X. A second Park & Ride lot in Gallatin is located at the Gallatin Farmers' Market.

Dickson's Planning Commission recently endorsed a plan to establish Park & Ride locations within Dickson, TN that will support express bus service expected to begin in the summer 2014. The express is expected to make a stop in Cheatham County. Dickson County Mayor Bob Rial said that the idea is to have a stop in Dickson, Burns and/or White Bluff where residents could catch a commuter bus that would take them to a landport in the West End area. From there a shuttle bus will run through the heart of downtown and into East Nashville with several stops along the way. On Monday, April 28, 2014, bus service between Nashville and Dickson began as a two-week pilot project.  RTA operated the pilot project to gauge the interest of commuters in Dickson. On Monday, July 21, 2014, The Dickson County Commission agreed to help fund an express commuter bus service to Nashville. The service was expected to officially launch in September 2014, composing of two buses that would depart from Dickson each morning and two that would return from Nashville on weeknights, but the local site for a Park & Ride had not yet been identified, caused a delay in the start of the express bus service until a location was found. With a Park & Ride lot location founded at the Dickson Walmart (located off Highway 46 and Beasley Drive), bus service from Dickson to Nashville began on Monday, January 5, 2015 as the 88X Dickson Express.

Cross-Town Routes
The crosstown services that do not terminate in downtown Nashville are the Wedgewood (route 21), the Midtown (route 25), the Grassmere/Edmondson Connector (route 72), the Bell Road (route 73), the Madison Connector (route 76), and the Thompson Lane Connector (route 77).

The University Connector (route 21) began on Sunday, September 30, 2012. This route provides cross-town service connecting five universities including Tennessee State University, Meharry Medical College, Fisk University, Vanderbilt University, Belmont University. Buses travel via the new 28th/31st Avenue Bridge every 30 to 60 minutes on weekdays and hourly on weekends. The route provides transfer points to 10 other MTA bus routes. It served Lipscomb University until September 29, 2019, when route 21 was rerouted to serve 100 Oaks instead of Lipscomb University; Lipscomb University is now served by the 12th Avenue South (route 17).

Bus Route List

Former Routes

Current and Upcoming Projects

Light Rail & Bus Rapid Transit

WeGo Star

The MTA took over operation of the Music City Star, now WeGo Star, commuter train in 2008 after initial service began in 2006.

Clarksville, TN is one step closer to having commuter rail to Nashville, after a firm was selected to conduct a study. The Regional Transportation Authority has hired the firm of Parsons Brinkerhoff to conduct a study to provide consensus among the RTA, the Nashville Area MPO, the Clarksville Urbanized Area MPO and community stakeholders on cost-effective transit improvements to serve the northwest area of Middle Tennessee.

Music City Central
In May 2007, MTA began construction of Music City Central at a cost of $54,000,000, a downtown transfer station that replaced the outdoor Downtown Transit Mall on Deaderick Street. The facility opened to the public on Oct. 26, 2008. Music City Central is a two-story facility with climate-controlled waiting areas. Riders can buy tickets, check bus schedules, and shop at a convenience store or Dunkin' Donuts located at the facility. A multi-story public parking garage is located above the transfer portion of the facility.

BRT (Bus Rapid Transit) Lite

56 Gallatin Road BRT Lite

After years of study, MTA secured taxpayer funding to purchase the vehicles necessary for a bus rapid transit (BRT) light line.  On September 27, 2009, MTA implemented the first phase of its new BRT service on the Gallatin Road corridor, designated as route 56 Gallatin Road BRT Lite.  Covering , this BRT service operates from Music City Central to the edge of Sumner County just north of RiverGate Mall.  Passengers experience fewer stops and more frequent buses as they travel along one of Nashville's busiest corridors on all new , articulated, fuel-efficient hybrid buses. BRT buses stop at designated stops that are marked with a green "BRT stop" sign. During the second phase of BRT in spring 2010, more customer amenities were added. Gallatin Road intersections have Green Light Extenders that allow the traffic signals to stay green longer as a bus approaches.  In addition, each station stop features new enhanced passenger waiting areas.

55 Murfreesboro Pike BRT Lite

A second high use corridor was identified for implementation and funding goes along Murfreesboro Pike. The 55 Murfreesboro Pike BRT Lite, which began service on Monday, April 1, 2013, comes three years after the 56 Gallatin Road BRT Lite, a 12-mile stretch from downtown's Music City Central to RiverGate Mall, began service. The Murfreesboro Pike BRT Lite stretches from downtown to the Antioch area near the Global Mall at the Crossings, formerly Hickory Hollow Mall.

50 Charlotte Pike BRT Lite

Originally, Nashville Mayor Karl Dean had hoped to start running "lite" bus rapid transit service on Charlotte and Nolensville pikes in 2014., but plans for the Charlotte BRT Lite were discussed at several public meetings in late January and early February 2015. On March 2, 2015, it was announced that Charlotte Pike will be the third major corridor in Nashville to have BRT Lite service, joining Gallatin Pike and Murfreesboro Pike. 50 Charlotte Pike BRT, which began service on Monday, March 30, 2015, offers limited stops traveling between Music City Central in downtown to the Charlotte Walmart located off River Road.

52 Nolensville Pike BRT Lite

In March 2015, preliminary plans began for a BRT Lite route to be on Nolensville Pike to begin in the fall of 2015. 
Route 52 Nolensville Pike BRT lite, which began service on Sunday, March 27, 2016, operates on Nolensville Pike and offers more frequent service, but with fewer
stops. All buses serve Nolensville Pike between Downtown and Harding Place with branches to Hickory Plaza (Route 52A) and Wallace/Ezell (Route 52B). While the other previous BRT Lite corridors (Gallatin Pike, Murfreesboro Pike, and Charlotte Pike) all feature both a local service to supplement their perspective BRT lite lines, the Nolensville Pike corridor only features the 52 Nolensville Pike BRT Lite (which replaces the 12 Nolensville Road route).

Music City Circuit

The Music City Circuit is a free circulator bus service in downtown Nashville, began March 29, 2010 to replace the 94 Music City Star Downtown Shuttle.

It operates two lines- the Blue Circuit (which serves the Bicentennial Mall) and the Green Circuit (which serves the Gulch). The Blue Circuit operates 6:30 a.m. to 6:00 p.m. on weekdays, and 11:00 a.m. to 6:00 p.m. on Saturdays. Likewise, the Green Circuit operates 6:30 a.m. to midnight on weekdays and 11:00 a.m. to midnight Saturdays.

Beginning in late March 2015, Sunday service of the Blue and Green routes were added with operating hours of 11 a.m. to 11 p.m.

Neighborhood Mini Hubs
Nashville MTA is working on plans to add two neighborhood transit "mini-hubs" that will provide better transit and pedestrian connectivity through cross-town bus connections, more local transfer points for riders, and a safe and secure waiting area.

The new transit mini-hubs will be strategically located in North Nashville and near the Harding/Nolensville Pike intersection in southeast Nashville. Each mini-hub facility is designed to connect transit users to neighborhoods, commercial areas, parks, greenways and other recreational facilities, and will include a litany of pedestrian-friendly amenities for those wishing to access the greater MTA transit system.

Secure bike racks will give cyclists the option to store their bicycles while riding transit. Upgraded crosswalks, sidewalks, lighting and pedestrian signals will help ensure the safety of those who are walking to and from the mini-hub. The well-lit and secure shelters will give riders cover from the elements while they wait.

Trapeze/AVL Project
As part of Nashville MTA's new comprehensive transportation management system, MTA customers will soon be able to see where their buses are in "real time" on their computers and smartphones giving them more room to better manage their trips and their time. The technology is just one part of MTA's large system upgrade that includes Computer Aided Dispatch (CAD) and Automatic Vehicle Location (AVL) technology from Trapeze Group.

One of the major benefits of the new system is its GPS-based vehicle tracking feature, which helps large transit systems manage their fleets more efficiently and streamlines processes and procedures. In late 2015, MTA bus customers will be able to view on their devices real-time up-to-date stop and arrival times based on vehicle locations. The functionality will be the basis on which third parties can build apps to show where buses are moving along a route. Real time transit information also will be available on digital readouts at Music City Central and eventually at BRT lite stations on Gallatin Pike, Murfreesboro Pike and Charlotte Pike.

nMotion
The MTA/RTA transit system is conducting a strategic planning process called nMotion to find new and innovative ways to improve transportation in Nashville. nMotion is the Nashville MTA/RTA's Strategic Plan, a 25-year comprehensive plan designed to meet the Nashville area's vision for transit. The plan will look at how the transit system works today and identify opportunities to enhance the transit system, improve service, attract and retain new riders and meet the growing needs of the Nashville region. Throughout the project, the public will engage in developing the blueprint of actions to make the best opportunities a reality.

In March 2016, Nashville MTA/RTA began asking for input on three future scenarios for the region's transit system at a series of community meetings. Each scenario presents different transit options for Davidson County and Middle Tennessee. At the meetings, attendees have the chance to review the scenarios and provide input on which strategies the region should consider to improve its transit system.

Light rail

In October 2017, Mayor Megan Barry unveiled her $5.2 billion plans for expanding Nashville's transportation infrastructure including the addition of light rail service with a tunnel through downtown. The transit plan was rejected by voters in a referendum the following May.

Nashville Connector

The Nashville Connector is a program that partners with both city and private sectors to connect commuters to more sustainable commuting options.  Nashville used to be a town where everything with a 15-minute drive, but with the booming population, jobs and homes are spreading out.  The idea of a short commute is something of the past (this is the epitome of urban sprawl); the Nashville Connector serves as a way to close this gap and make commuting in a more sustainable fashion a better and more accessible option.  The push towards making a more commuter friendly city - resulting in social connection as seen through transportation -  comes with many other secondary perks; these include, but are not limited to, the reinforcement of complete streets, a decrease in pollutants, and a decrease in congestion.  Nashville Connector provides a plethora of services; this spans from getting people connected to bus routes and carpools, but also connects people to different bike routes around the city, and facilitates a safe walking space.

Nashville Connector was founded by the Metro Planning Department, and works closely with the Metro Public Work staff.  While this is still a relatively new initiative, with the support of Mayor John Cooper, it has quickly taken off.  Cooper has backed this program as a way to manage Nashville's traffic demand.  In his planning of making Nashville's transportation and infrastructure more sustainable, he endorsed this resource.

There are two downfalls when it comes to the Nashville Connector.  The first of these is that it has little to no publicity; the connector provides people with cheaper and more sustainable transportation, and also offers a platform to educate and affect both individuals and companies as a whole.  However, unless one knows about Nashville Connector, it is hard to initially get involved with them, so that one can reap the benefits.  The second push back the program has received is that the service is harder to infiltrate when a person is not associated with an employer; although it does help community members, the support of an employer or company helps with long-term support.  The underfunding of transit results in a self fulfilling prophecy; people tend to shy away from using public transit because they are unaware of how accessible and easy it is to use, thus there is a gross lack of funds.

Cancelled Projects

The Amp (formally known as the East-West Connector)
Mayor Karl Dean had his eyes set on a full-fledged bus rapid transit system taking passengers from West End Avenue down Broadway, across the river to East Nashville's Five Points district. The Amp (formally known as the East-West Connector) would have begun at Five Points in East Nashville and extends down Broadway, West End and Harding Road to White Bridge Road.

The difference between the AMP and the BRT Lite (at the time only available in operation along Gallatin Road and Murfreesboro Pike) is that the former would have been a full-fledged bus rapid transit system, with buses occupying exclusive lanes of traffic.

On the afternoon of January 22, 2015, Nashville Metropolitan Transit Authority announced that it will "cease work on the Amp," though strategic planning for mass transit in the region will continue.

Bus Fleet

Active Fixed Route Fleet 
43 Whites Creek, TN Express / Maplewood High School / Whites Creek to Express

2006 route 43

2007 route 23 Dickerson road green Parkwood - Chesapake

References

Transportation in Nashville, Tennessee
Transportation in Davidson County, Tennessee
Bus transportation in Tennessee
Government agencies established in 1973
Intermodal transportation authorities in Tennessee
Bus rapid transit in Tennessee